Guido Richard van Gheluwe (3 April 1926, in Kortrijk – 1 October 2014, in Kortrijk) was a Belgian lawyer and founder of the Orde van den Prince. He founded the Orde van den Prince on 2 November 1955, and was its president from 1955 until 1964. Since July 1965 he bears the honorary title of President Founder of the Orde van den Prince.

Education
Guido Van Gheluwe went to high school at the St. Amandscollege in Kortrijk, where he graduated in 1946. He obtained a PhD in law at the University of Ghent in 1951.

Career
He joined the bar in Kortrijk in 1951 and worked as a lawyer until 1966. From 1952 until 1955 he was the private secretary of the minister for Belgian Congo.

From 2 November 1966 until 24 September 1971 he was the secretary-general of the non-profit organization Economic Council for Flanders (Dutch: Economische Raad voor Vlaanderen, E.R.V.). From 25 September 1971 until 26 September 1985 he was secretary-general of the Regional Economic Council for Flanders (Dutch: Gewestelijke   Economische Raad voor Vlaanderen, GERV). From 27 September 1985 until 31 April 1986, he was secretary-general of the Social-Economic Council for Flanders.

He is professor emeritus of the Hoger Instituut voor Bestuurswetenschappen in Antwerp, where he taught from 1 October 1978 until 31 April 1986.

Sources
 In Memoriam Guido van Gheluwe (Dutch)
 Heel de Orde van den Prince wordt ereburger (Dutch, newspaper article)

1926 births
20th-century Belgian lawyers
Ghent University alumni
2014 deaths